Ivano-Frankivsk Oblast local election, 2002 is a local election in Ivano-Frankivsk Oblast.

Results 

Presidium of the Council
Chairman: Vasyl Brus (unaffiliated)
First Deputy Chairman:
Deputy Chairman:
Director of Council's secretariat:

Electoral maps

References

External links 
 Official website Ivano-Frankivsk Oblast Council
 Monitoring the electoral process in Western region

Local elections in Ukraine
2002 elections in Ukraine
History of Ivano-Frankivsk Oblast